Rainforth is an English-language surname, a variation of the toponymic surname Rainford from the village Rainford, Lancashire. Notable people with the surname include:

 Elizabeth Rainforth (1814–1877), British opera singer and music arranger
 John Rainforth (born 1934), British bobsledder

See also 
 
 Rainsford, variant spelling
 Ranford (surname), variant spelling
 James Renforth, (1842–1871), English Tyneside professional oarsman

References 

English-language surnames
English toponymic surnames